Danielle St-Amand (born April 8, 1964) is a politician in the Canadian province of Quebec, who was elected to represent the riding of Trois-Rivières in the National Assembly of Quebec in the 2008 provincial election. She is a member of the Quebec Liberal Party.

She now works as a business coach and strategy advisor at Concordia Cabinet-conseil inc. in Trois-Rivières.

Prior to her political career, Saint-Amand worked 14 years in the field of education and was manager for the Mauricie Tourism Association and the Trois-Rivières hospital Foundation (financial campaign). In 2007, she was the manager for the Saint-Tite Western Festival.

She was rewarded in 2003 for a Management Award by the Association des professionnels en gestion philanthropique du Québec.

References

External links
 
 Liberal Party biography 

French Quebecers
Living people
Quebec Liberal Party MNAs
Women MNAs in Quebec
1964 births
21st-century Canadian politicians
21st-century Canadian women politicians